E.T. Straw Family Stadium is a baseball venue in Emmitsburg, Maryland, United States.  It is home to the Mount St. Mary's Mountaineers baseball team of the NCAA Division I Metro Atlantic Athletic Conference.  The stadium is part of the larger PNC Sports Complex.

In 2007, the stadium underwent $400,000 renovations, thanks to the donation of Mount St. Mary's alumnus E.T. Straw.  The venue was dedicated to Straw as a result.  The renovations added a new backstop, outfield fence, a warning track, bullpens, and foul poles.  A new press box, sound system, and bleachers were also added. A second round of renovations occurred in 2017, with the addition of a synthetic turf infield and padded outfield fences.

See also 
 List of NCAA Division I baseball venues

References 

College baseball venues in the United States
Baseball venues in Maryland
Mount St. Mary's Mountaineers baseball